Etadunna may refer to:

 Etadunna, South Australia, the gazetted locality named for the station
 Etadunna Airstrip, an airfield in South Australia
 Etadunna Formation, a  geological formation found in Queensland - refer Baru
 Etadunna Station, a pastoral lease in northeastern South Australia